Sunny & the Sunglows (formed by songwriter Jimmie Lewing and Sunny Ozuna in Palacios, Texas) was an American musical group in started 1959, and later known as Sunny & the Sunliners in 1963 after moving to San Antonio, Texas.

Career
The group's members were all Chicano-born with the exception of Amos Johnson Jr., and their style was a blend of rhythm and blues, tejano, blues, and mariachi. They first recorded in 1962 for their own label, Sunglow. Okeh Records picked up their single "Golly Gee" for national distribution that year, and in 1963, Huey P Meaux, a producer from Louisiana and owner of Tear Drop Records, had them record a remake of Little Willie John's 1958 hit, "Talk to Me, Talk to Me". The single "Talk to Me" (b/w "Every Week, Every Month, Every Year"), released on Tear Drop Records, went to No. 4 on the Adult Contemporary chart, No. 12 on the US Billboard R&B chart, and No. 11 on the Billboard Hot 100 in October 1963.

Members
 Sunny Ozuna – lead vocals
 Vincent Chente Montez – vocals (Bass)
 Manuel Guerra – leader
 Rudy Guerra – tenor sax
 Gregg Ramirez – bass
 Henry Nanez – guitar
 Manuel Martinez – guitar
 Tommy Luna – tenor sax
 Andy Ortiz – piano (Sunglows era)
 Arthur Gonzalez – electric piano
 Martin Liñan – alto sax
 Gilbert Fernandez – tenor sax
 Amos Johnson Jr. – trumpet
 Bobby Solis – drums
 Joel Dilley – bass
 Joe Cortez III – keyboards, vocals (1977–78)
 Johnny Guerra – guitar, vocals
 Carlos Hernandez – alto sax, vocals
 Jimmy Solis – tenor sax, vocals
 Bobby Gutierrez – tenor and bari sax
 David Silva – trumpet
 Roger Rivera – trombone
 David DeLaGarza – keyboards
 Frank Ardila – guitar
 Arturo Alderete - bass (1973-75)
 Charlie Sandoval - percussion

Discography
Talk to Me (Tear Drop Records, LP2000 1964)
All Night Worker (Tear Drop, LP2019 1964)
Las Vegas Welcomes (Tear Drop, 1964)
Adelante (Key-Loc, 1964)
The Original Peanuts (Sunglow Records, LP103 1965)
Smile Now Cry Later (Key-Loc 3001 1966)
Live in Hollywood (Key-Loc 3003 1966)
Little Brown Eyed Soul (Key-Loc, 1968)
The Versatile (Key-Loc, 1969)
Young, Gifted and Brown (Key-Loc, 1971)
El Orgullo de Texas (Key-Loc, 1974)
El Preferido (Key-Loc, 1974)
Yesterday...& Sunny (Teardrop Records, 1976)
Siempre (Key-Loc, 1976)
Palabritas (Key-Loc, 1976)
Andale Mi Amor (Key-Loc, 1977)
This Is My Band (Key-Loc 3006 1977)
Live in Las Vegas (Key-Loc, 1978)
Yesterday and Sunny Vol. II (Key-Loc, 1978)
Grande Grande Grande (Key-Loc, 1978)
Vengo a Verte (Key-Loc, 1979)
Cry (Key-Loc, 1980)
El Amante: Sunny & The Sunliners (Freddie Records – LP-026 1981)

References

External links 

Musical groups from Texas
Tear Drop Records artists
Okeh Records artists
Chicano rock musicians
American musicians of Mexican descent